USRA may refer to:

 Undergraduate Student Research Award of the Natural Sciences and Engineering Research Council (NSERC USRA), a prestigious research award for top Canadian undergraduate researchers
União dos Sindicatos Revolucionarios de Angola (Union of Revolutionary Trade Unions of Angola)
United Slot Racers Association, a slot racing organizations
United States Racquetball Association, former name of USA Racquetball
United States Railroad Administration (1917-1920), the nationalized rail system during World War I
USRA standard locomotives built by this administration
United States Railway Association (1974-1987), the corporation that oversaw the creation of Conrail
Universities Space Research Association, a Washington, D.C. based nonprofit corporation under the auspices of the National Academy of Sciences